George Stulac (born June 28, 1933 in Toronto, Ontario) is a retired basketball player and track and field athlete from Canada, who represented his native country at three consecutive Summer Olympics (1956, 1960 and 1964). In 1956 and 1964 he was a member of the Canadian Men's National Basketball Team. In 1960 Stulac competed in the men's decathlon competition, having won the bronze medal the previous year at the 1959 Pan American Games.

Stulac was inducted into the Canadian Basketball Hall of Fame in 2015.

References

External links
 Canadian Olympic Committee

1933 births
Living people
Athletes from Toronto
Athletes (track and field) at the 1959 Pan American Games
Athletes (track and field) at the 1960 Summer Olympics
Basketball players from Toronto
Basketball players at the 1956 Summer Olympics
Basketball players at the 1964 Summer Olympics
Canadian decathletes
Canadian men's basketball players
Olympic basketball players of Canada
Olympic track and field athletes of Canada
Pan American Games bronze medalists for Canada
Pan American Games medalists in athletics (track and field)
Track and field athletes from Ontario
Medalists at the 1959 Pan American Games